State Route 127 (SR 127) is a primary state highway in the U.S. state of Virginia.  The state highway begins at the West Virginia state line at Good, West Virginia, where the highway continues west as West Virginia Route 127 (WV 127).  SR 127 heads east  to U.S. Route 522 (US 522) near Cross Junction in northwestern Frederick County.  SR 127 is the easternmost portion of Bloomery Pike, a turnpike that connected Winchester with the namesake iron smelting center.

Route description

SR 127 begins on the West Virginia state line in northwestern Frederick County near the West Virginia hamlet of Good. The point where SR 127 begins is an arbitrary point on the state line where West Virginia maintenance on the road begins and signs reflecting the state and county are posted. Bloomery Pike continues west as WV 127, which passes through the historic community of Bloomery on its way to a junction with WV 29 at Forks of Cacapon.  SR 127 heads east atop the state line until the highway fully enters Virginia at Timber Ridge, where the state line turns south.  The state highway descends from Timber Ridge into the valley of Crockett Run, which the highway follows to its eastern terminus at US 522 (Frederick Pike) northwest of Cross Junction.

Major intersections

References

External links

Virginia Highways Project: VA 127

127
State Route 127